The president of the Canary Islands is the head of government of the Canary Islands, one of the 17 autonomous communities of Spain, while the monarch Felipe VI remains the head of state as king of Spain (and therefore of the Canary Islands).

List

Presidents of the junta (pre-autonomy)

Presidents of the government (after the approval of the Statute of Autonomy)

Timeline

Sources
World Statesmen.org